The second SS Kaiser Wilhelm II, named for the German Emperor, was a 19,361-gross register ton passenger ship built at Stettin, Germany (now Szczecin, Poland). The ship was completed in the spring of 1903. At the time of her launch she was larger by 1,900 tons than any other German ship and was surpassed in the weight of her hull and machinery only by the British liners RMS Cedric and RMS Celtic. The ship was seized by the U.S. Government during World War I, and subsequently served as a transport ship under the name USS Agamemnon. A famous photograph taken by Alfred Stieglitz called The Steerage, as well as descriptions of the conditions of travel in the lowest class, have conflicted with her otherwise glitzy reputation as a high class, high speed trans-Atlantic liner.

Design
The Kaiser Wilhelm II was built with a full double-bottom along the hull. She was divided into 26 watertight compartments via 16 transverse bulkheads and one longitudinal bulkhead separating the engine rooms. She was designed so that any two compartments could flood and the ship stay afloat. 52 watertight doors were distributed between the bulkheads, 24 of which could be closed from the bridge via the Dörr mechanism.

Interiors
Kaiser Wilhelm II could accommodate 775 First-Class passengers in 290 cabins, and 343 Second-Class passengers in 102 cabins. There was room for another 770 in Third-Class. The two First-Class "Imperial" suites were the finest accommodation aboard, each featuring a dining room, drawing room, bedroom, and bathroom. There were 8 suites with sitting room, bedroom, and bathroom and another 8 cabins with an adjoining bathroom. 

The design of the ship's interiors was entrusted to Johann Poppe, who had designed the interiors of the SS Kaiser Wilhelm der Grosse and the  SS Kronprinz Wilhelm. The First-Class dining saloon was three decks high and designed in Poppe's signature German Baroque revival style. It was 108 feet long and 69 feet wide, the full beam of the ship. It could accommodate 554 diners. Other First-Class amenities included a children's saloon, a typewriting room, smoking room, drawing room, reading and writing room, and two cafés on the bridge deck.

German career

Designed for high speed trans-Atlantic service, Kaiser Wilhelm II was launched at Stettin on 12 August 1902, in the presence of the German Emperor, for whom it was named by Miss Wiegand, daughter of Heinrich Wiegand, director of its owner Norddeutscher Lloyd. Her design allowed for guns to be installed so that the ship could act as an auxiliary to the German Navy.

She won the Blue Riband for the fastest eastbound crossing in 1904. In the years before the outbreak of World War I, she made regular trips between Germany and New York City, carrying passengers both prestigious (in first class) and profitable (in the much more austere steerage).

On 17 June 1914 Kaiser Wilhelm II collided with the 3,000-ton British steamer Incemore in thick fog off the Needles. Kaiser hull was holed below the waterline, but the ship's watertight bulkheads held and the ship returned to Southampton under her own power. Kaiser Wilhelm II was west-bound when war with Britain began on 4 August 1914 and, after evading patrolling British cruisers, arrived at New York two days later.

United States military service

She was seized by the U.S. Government when it declared war on Germany on 6 April 1917, and work soon began to repair her machinery, sabotaged earlier by a German caretaker crew, and otherwise prepare the ship for use as a transport. While this work progressed, she was employed as a barracks ship at the New York Navy Yard.

The U.S. Navy placed the ship in commission as USS Kaiser Wilhelm II (ID-3004) in late August 1917. Her name was changed to Agamemnon at the beginning of September and active war work commenced at the end of October, when she left for her first troopship voyage to France. While at sea on 9 November 1917, she was damaged in a collision with another large ex-German transport, but delivered her passengers to the war zone a few days later. Following her return to the U.S. in December and subsequent repair work, Agamemnon again steamed to France in mid-January 1918 and thereafter regularly crossed the Atlantic as part of the effort to establish a major American military presence on the Western Front. The routine was occasionally punctuated by encounters with real or suspected U-boats and, during the autumn of 1918, with outbreaks of influenza on board.

In mid-December 1918, just over a month after the Armistice ended the fighting, Agamemnon began to bring Americans home from France. She made nine voyages by August 1919, carrying nearly 42,000 service personnel, some four thousand more than she had transported overseas during wartime. USS Agamemnon was decommissioned in late August and turned over to the War Department for further use as a U.S. Army Transport. Laid up after the middle 1920s, she was renamed Monticello in 1927 but had no further active service.  Monticello was considered too old for future use and sold for scrap in 1940.

References

External links

 Lostliners: SS Kaiser Wilhelm II
 
Description of Passenger Conditions in the Steerage and second class passenger compartments on the Kaiser Wilhelm II in 1905
 Kaiser Wilhelm II on The Great Ocean Liners
 photo gallery at Naval Historical Center

Ships of Norddeutscher Lloyd
World War I passenger ships of Germany
Blue Riband holders
Steamships
Kaiser-class ocean liners
Ships built in Stettin
Four funnel liners
1902 ships

nl:Kaiser Wilhelm der Grosse